The 1847 Lewes by-election was an uncontested election held on 17 March 1847. The by-election was brought about due to the resignation of the incumbent Whig MP, Sir Howard Elphinstone. It was won by the Whig/Liberal candidate Robert Perfect, who was the only declared candidate.

See also

List of United Kingdom by-elections (1832–1847)

References

1847 in England
Lewes
1847 elections in the United Kingdom
By-elections to the Parliament of the United Kingdom in Sussex constituencies
19th century in Sussex
March 1847 events
Unopposed by-elections to the Parliament of the United Kingdom in English constituencies